West York may refer to:
West York, Illinois
West York, Pennsylvania
West York Island in the South China Sea